The First Lady of the Czech Republic is the hostess of the Prague Castle, advisor to the president, and often plays a role in social activism. The position is traditionally held by the wife of the president of the Czech Republic, concurrent with his term of office. She has no official role in the presidency and her role is strictly ceremonial.

The current first lady of the Czech Republic is Eva Pavlová. She has been the first lady since 9 March 2023 as wife of President Petr Pavel.

List of first ladies of the Czech Republic

See also 
 First Lady of Czechoslovakia

References 

First ladies of the Czech Republic
Czech Republic
Czech Republic politics-related lists
First Lady